Three Comrades may refer to:

Three Comrades (novel), written in 1938 by Erich Maria Remarque
Three Comrades (1938 film), a 1938 adaptation of the novel, made the same year
Three Comrades (1935 film), a 1935 Soviet film